Ilirët Rugby Club (Albanian: Klubi i Regbisë Ilirët) is an Albanian rugby team based in Tirana. It is named after the ancient tribes of Illyrians which inhabited the region of present-day Albania. The Organization for Security and Co-operation in Europe (OSCE) sponsors the club.

References

Albanian rugby union teams
Sport in Tirana